Darren Richard Lorenzo Beckford (born 12 May  1967) is an English former professional footballer who played as a forward. His younger brother Jason also played professional football.

In fourteen years as a professional footballer he scored a total of 96 goals in 302 league games. Advancing through the Manchester City youth team, he also spent a brief time on loan at Bury before joining Port Vale in 1987. He enjoyed the most successful time of his career at Vale, scoring 68 goals in 167 league games, helping the club to promotion via the play-offs in 1989. After four successive seasons as the club's top scorer he earned a £925,000 move to Norwich City in 1991. Unable to find the form he hit at Vale Park, he was sold on to Oldham Athletic for £300,000 in 1993. Three years later he moved on to Scottish side Hearts. He later played for Preston North End, Fulham, Walsall, Rushden & Diamonds, Southport, Total Network Solutions, Bury and Bacup Borough.

Career

Manchester City onto Port Vale
Beckford was a product of the Manchester City youth team; he made eleven appearances for the Maine Road side before spending loan periods at Bury and Port Vale, moving to Third Division Vale on a permanent basis for £15,000 (plus 50% of any future transfer fee – a clause that Vale later bought out for an undisclosed sum). This was settled by a Football League tribunal as a compromise between Vale's offer of £5,000 and City's demand of £60,000. Vale fans raised £7,500 of the fee with a 'buy a player' fund. He later admitted that throughout his early career his nerves caused him to vomit before games.

He scored his first hat-trick for the club on 2 April 1988, during a 5–0 demolition of Doncaster Rovers. Throughout 1987–88 he was the club's top scorer with ten goals, along with David Riley. That season Vale won every game in which Beckford made it onto the score sheet. He was once again top scorer in 1988–89, this time bagging 23 goals as the club won promotion to the Second Division via the play-offs. On 19 September, he scored a hat-trick in a 5–0 home win over Chesterfield. On 25 March, he scored a hat-trick in a 4–1 victory over Notts County. On 25 May, he scored a hat-trick as Vale beat Preston North End 3–1 in the play-off semi-final second leg, giving them a 4–2 aggregate victory. He also provided the crucial second goal of the 1989 final, flicking on a corner for Robbie Earle to knock into the net. He adapted well to tougher opposition in the 1989–90 season. He managed 21 goals to become the club's top scorer yet again. With 23 goals in 1990–91, he became the club's top scorer for the fourth consecutive season. He managed to bag a hat-trick against Blackburn Rovers, and also found the net against former club Manchester City in the FA Cup.

In all he played 214 games and scored 81 times for John Rudge's side. He was sold to Norwich City in June 1991. The fee that Norwich paid for him – £925,000 – was set by a Football League tribunal (Vale had wanted £1.5 million) and was a club record that stood until 1994. £200,000 of the sum went to Manchester City. Vale signed his brother Jason to replace him, though he could not replicate his elder sibling's success.

Norwich City
Norwich manager Dave Stringer had been looking to sign a regular goalscorer for some time, and when Beckford signed he described him as "the answer to the Norwich supporters prayers". His spell at Carrow Road was inconsistent, however, and he only scored 13 times in 49 appearances. Supporters in particular criticised the fact that many of these goals were scored against weaker opposition in the League Cup. The highlight of his time at Norwich was his hat-trick in a 4–3 win against Everton – a victory which would prove key to the Canaries avoiding the drop in 1991–92. That season he also proved to be a versatile player, taking over in goal when Bryan Gunn sustained a back injury during a game against Sheffield United at Bramall Lane. He made a number of fine saves but was finally beaten Ian Bryson in a 1–0 defeat.

The 1992–93 season signalled the beginning of the end for Beckford as a Norwich City player. In the close season Mike Walker signed Mark Robins for £800,000 from Manchester United, and started to push Chris Sutton up from central defence to lead the Norwich attack. A lack of form also meant that he had now fallen behind Lee Power and Rob Newman in the pecking order. However Beckford was still able to make some crucial contributions, including a scoring a vital goal in a 3–2 victory against fellow title chasers Aston Villa at Villa Park.

Oldham and final years
After less than two seasons with Norwich, Beckford was sold to Oldham Athletic in 1993 for £300,000. He played 52 times and scored 17 goals before being released in the summer of 1996. He then spent the next two years unsuccessfully searching for a club to give him first team football. Initially after leaving Oldham he joined Hearts, where he contributed to their run to the 1996 Scottish League Cup Final. After goals against St Johnstone and Dundee, he played as a substitute in the final itself. These were however the only two goals he scored for Hearts. He then signed short-term deals with Fulham, Walsall, Rushden & Diamonds, Southport, Total Network Solutions, Bury, and Bacup Borough before retiring.

Style of play
Beckford was an athletic forward, who had pace, power and a tremendous leap.

Post-retirement
Beckford also began working for The Prince's Trust working with youngsters in Manchester. In September 1998 he won a successful tribunal case against the trust for being racially victimised.

Beckford was featured on the Sky Sports series "Where Are They Now?", and he is now working as an attendance officer at Claremont Primary School in Moss Side, Manchester.

Personal life
His parents, Dudley and Valdene, were from Jamaica. His brother Jason Beckford is a former professional footballer, and his nephew Ethan Beckford has also played professional football.

Career statistics

Honours
Port Vale
Football League Third Division play-offs: 1989

References

1967 births
Living people
People from Moss Side
English footballers
Black British sportsmen
English people of Jamaican descent
Association football forwards
Manchester City F.C. players
Bury F.C. players
Port Vale F.C. players
Norwich City F.C. players
Oldham Athletic A.F.C. players
Heart of Midlothian F.C. players
Preston North End F.C. players
Fulham F.C. players
Walsall F.C. players
Rushden & Diamonds F.C. players
Southport F.C. players
The New Saints F.C. players
Bacup Borough F.C. players
English Football League players
Premier League players
Scottish Football League players
National League (English football) players
Cymru Premier players